The Ranger L-440 (company designation 6-440C)  are six-cylinder inline inverted air-cooled aero-engines produced by the Ranger Aircraft Engine Division of the Fairchild Engine and Airplane Corporation of Farmingdale, New York, United States. The engine was mainly produced for Fairchild's family of training aircraft in the mid-1930s.

Variants
6-440C-2
175hp variant with a 6:1 compression ratio.
6-440C-3
180hp variant with a 6.2:1 compression ratio.
6-440C-4
190hp variant with a 6.8:1 compression ratio.
6-440C-5
200hp variant with a 7.5:1 compression ratio.

Applications
 Fairchild 24
 Fairchild PT-19/26
 Falconar SAL Mustang
 Grumman Widgeon
 Maestranza Central de Aviación HF XX-02
 St. Louis PT-LM-4

Specifications (6-440C-2)

See also

References

Notes

Bibliography

 

Air-cooled aircraft piston engines
1930s aircraft piston engines
Inverted aircraft piston engines
Straight-six engines